Kotugodella Fort, also known as Katugodalla Fort or Katugodælla Balakotuwa, was a Portuguese fort, located near Haldummulla. In 1630 the Portuguese, under the command of Constantino de Sá de Noronha attempted to use the ldalgashinna pass to force a way into the Uva. The fort was used as a staging post for troops in the attack.

All that remains of the fort are the stone foundations of the semi-circular bastions. 

The fort was declared a protected archaeological site in November 2002.

References

See also
Forts in Sri Lanka
Haldummulla fort

Buildings and structures in Badulla District
Forts in Uva Province
Portuguese forts in Sri Lanka
Archaeological protected monuments in Badulla District